Friedrich "Fritz" Spengler (September 6, 1908 – March 10, 2003) was a German field handball player who competed in the 1936 Summer Olympics.

He was part of the German field handball team, which won the gold medal. He played two matches including the final.

External links
Fritz Spengler's profile at databaseOlympics

1908 births
2003 deaths
Field handball players at the 1936 Summer Olympics
German male handball players
Olympic gold medalists for Germany
Olympic handball players of Germany
Olympic medalists in handball
Medalists at the 1936 Summer Olympics